Ashton is an unincorporated community in Mason County, West Virginia, United States. Ashton has a post office with ZIP code 25503.

The community was named for ash trees near the original town site.

References

Unincorporated communities in Mason County, West Virginia
Unincorporated communities in West Virginia
West Virginia populated places on the Ohio River